Goshen High School is a secondary school located at 101 Eagle Circle in Goshen, Alabama.

Community
The earliest record of a public school in Goshen was in the middle 19th century. A small wooden structure made from hand-split logs was located between Goshen and the Troy-Luverne Highway (U.S. Route 29) on a parcel of land called "Goshen Hill". This is what is now known as Mt. Zion Community. This first public school in Goshen was a one-room building with one teacher. The school term was whenever the students were not busy on the farm. The school was moved to its present site in the town of Goshen in 1897 and employed its first principal, Miss Ada Ray, about 1920. Goshen High School has grown continually over the past number of years, and has over 400 students in grades seven through twelve. The current principal is Major Lane.

Teaching grades
 mid-19th century to 1897 Grades (6 - 12)
 (Goshen Location) 1897 to 2004 Grades (6 - 12)
 2004 to present (7 - 12)

ARMT results
Scale: % meeting or exceeding standards

Grade 7
Reading
63% (2006)
68% (2005)
The state average for Reading was 74% in 2006.

Math
45% (2006)
52% (2005)
The state average for Math was 59% in 2006.

Source: Alabama Dept. of Education, 2005–2006

Grade 8
Reading
60% (2006)
65% (2005)
31% (2004)
The state average for Reading was 72% in 2006.

Math
67% (2006)
54% (2005)
The state average for Math was 68% in 2006.

Source: Alabama Dept. of Education, 2005–2006

Notable alumni
 Wesley Wright, Former MLB relief pitcher
 Mike Pelton, Former NFL player and current defensive line coach for the Georgia Tech Yellow Jackets

References

External links
 The Goshen High School Homepage

Public high schools in Alabama
Educational institutions established in 1897
Schools in Pike County, Alabama
Public middle schools in Alabama
1897 establishments in Alabama